Eigengrau (German for "intrinsic gray"), also called Eigenlicht (Dutch and German for "intrinsic light"), dark light, or brain gray, is the uniform dark gray background color that many people report seeing in the absence of light.  The term Eigenlicht dates back to the nineteenth century, but has rarely been used in recent scientific publications. Common scientific terms for the phenomenon include "visual noise" or "background adaptation". These terms arise due to the perception of an ever-changing field of tiny black and white dots seen in the phenomenon.

Eigengrau is perceived as lighter than a black object in normal lighting conditions, because contrast is more important to the visual system than absolute brightness. For example, the night sky looks darker than Eigengrau because of the contrast provided by the stars.

Cause 
Researchers noticed early on that the shape of intensity-sensitivity curves could be explained by assuming that an intrinsic source of noise in the retina produces random events indistinguishable from those triggered by real photons. Later experiments on rod cells of cane toads (Rhinella marina)  showed that the frequency of these spontaneous events is strongly temperature-dependent, which implies that they are caused by the thermal isomerization of rhodopsin. In human rod cells, these events occur about once every 100 seconds on average, which, taking into account the number of rhodopsin molecules in a rod cell, implies that the half-life of a rhodopsin molecule is about 420 years. The indistinguishability of dark events from photon responses supports this explanation, because rhodopsin is at the input of the transduction chain. On the other hand, processes such as the spontaneous release of neurotransmitters cannot be completely ruled out.

See also 
 Closed-eye hallucination
 Impossible color
 Visual snow

References 

Color
Darkness
Shades of gray
Vision